Yamforina Cove (‘Zaliv Yamforina’ \'za-liv yam-fo-'ri-na\) is the 4.55 km wide cove indenting for 3.1 km the east coast of Blagoevgrad Peninsula on Oscar II Coast in Graham Land, Antarctica.  It is entered south of Daskot Point and north of Kesten Point, and was formed as a result of the break-up of Larsen Ice Shelf in the area in 2002, and subsequent deglaciation.

The feature is named after the ancient Thracian settlement of Yamforina in southwestern Bulgaria.

Location
SCAR Antarctic Digital Database mapping in 2012.

Maps
 Antarctic Digital Database (ADD). Scale 1:250000 topographic map of Antarctica. Scientific Committee on Antarctic Research (SCAR). Since 1993, regularly upgraded and updated.

References
 Yamforina Cove. SCAR Composite Antarctic Gazetteer.
 Bulgarian Antarctic Gazetteer. Antarctic Place-names Commission. (details in Bulgarian, basic data in English)

External links
 Yamforina Cove. Copernix satellite image

Coves of Graham Land
Oscar II Coast
Bulgaria and the Antarctic